Mihály Szeróvay (born 14 May 1982 in Siófok) is a Hungarian football player who is retired from playing football. He is currently working for Solent University in Southampton, England. Later in 2020 he will move back to Finland to take up a position of "professor of football", with the University of Jyväskylä.

References

1982 births
Living people
Hungarian footballers
Veikkausliiga players
Ferencvárosi TC footballers
ESMTK footballers
BKV Előre SC footballers
JJK Jyväskylä players
Expatriate footballers in Spain
People from Siófok
Hungarian expatriate footballers
Expatriate footballers in Finland
Hungarian expatriates in Finland
Association football goalkeepers
Sportspeople from Somogy County